The following is a list of weather events that occurred in 2016.

Global conditions

Monthly summary

Summary by weather type

Winter storms and cold waves

Floods

Droughts, heat waves, and wildfires

Tornadoes

A small tornado outbreak occurred during a winter storm on February 2-3. An EF1 due to the outbreak caused $5.08 million. Three weeks later, the second largest tornado outbreak in February resulted in 7 deaths. The tornado outbreak caused $1.2 billion in damage.

Tropical cyclones

As the year began, a tropical low was over Australia, and Cyclone Ula was moving toward Tonga. At peak intensity, Winston made landfall on Fiji, the strongest ever to hit the country, and one of the strongest landfalls worldwide on record. Damage in Fiji totaled FJ$2.98 billion (US$1.4 billion), and 44 people were killed. In the Australian basin, there were 16 tropical cyclones, which made it the least-active season on record. Activity in the south-west Indian Ocean was also below average, with just tropical cyclones. Among these were Cyclone Fantala in April, which reached 10 minute sustained winds of 250 km/h (155 mph) while near the Seychelles, making it the strongest tropical cyclone on record in the basin.

The first northern hemisphere tropical cyclone was Hurricane Pali, a rare off-season hurricane which formed on January 7 southwest of Hawaii. There were an additional 22 tropical cyclones in the north-east Pacific Ocean during the year, including Hurricane Otto, which crossed from the Caribbean Sea in November, killing 23 people in Central America. Otto was the last of 16 tropical cyclones in the Atlantic Ocean. The first, Alex, was a rare January hurricane which hit the Azores. The strongest Atlantic hurricane of the year was Matthew, which attained 1 minute sustained winds of 165 mph (270 km/h) in the Caribbean. Matthew killed 603 people and left at least US$15 billion in damage after its path through Haiti, Cuba, The Bahamas, and offshore the southeastern United States. In August, Hurricane Earl killed 81 people in southeast Mexico after it struck Belize.

In the north Indian Ocean, there were ten tropical cyclones. Among these were Cyclone Roanu in May, which killed 135 people in Sri Lanka and Bangladesh, causing over US$2 billion in damage. In contrast to the unusually early start to activity in the north-east Pacific and the Atlantic, the first tropical cyclone in the north-west Pacific did not develop until May 25, when a tropical depression formed. It was the first of 51 tropical cyclones during the year. The strongest of the year was Typhoon Meranti, which reached 10 minute sustained winds of 220 km/h (140 mph) while moving through the Batanes in the Philippines. Meranti later struck China, and along its path it killed 47 people, with US$4.79 billion in damage. In July, Typhoon Nepartak killed 111 people and left US$1.89 billion in damage when it struck Taiwan and southeastern China. In August, Typhoon Lionrock became the first storm on record to strike the Tōhoku region of Japan, with 22 deaths in the country and 525 deaths from flooding in North Korea.

Timeline
This is a timeline of weather events during 2016.  Please note that entries might cross between months, however, all entries are listed by the month they started.

January

January 12-17 - Hurricane Alex kills one person, and becomes the first Hurricane in January in the Atlantic since 1938.
January 21-29 - A historical blizzard, the most recent to be rated a category 5 on the Regional Snowfall Index scale, causes 55 deaths and between $500 million and $3 billion in damage.

February

A tornado outbreak consisting of 61 tornadoes, the second largest on record for February, caused 7 deaths and $1.2 billion.

March

April

May

May 1 – 2016 Fort McMurray wildfire: a wildfire erupts after record high temperatures in April in northern Alberta, forcing the evacuation of the entire city of Fort McMurray in Alberta. It is the largest mass evacuation in Canadian history. The wildfire destroys more than 3000 buildings, burns nearly 600,000 hectares of land, and causes nearly $10 billion in damages. The wildfire is the costliest natural disaster in Canadians history.
May 7-10 - A tornado outbreak of 57 tornadoes caused 2 deaths, 19 injuries and $1 billion in damage.
May 15 – A nighttime EF2 tornado in Brazil killed four people and injured 21 others.
May 22-26 - A tornado outbreak sequence spawns 98 tornadoes, which caused 11 injuries and $1.3 billion in damage.

June

June 23 - The Jiangsu tornado in China caused 98 deaths and 846 injuries,  amounting to $760 million in damage. The tornado was rated EF4. Another unrated tornado caused an additional fatality.

July

August

September

September 9 - Philadelphia, for the first time in history, has a low above  in September.
September 28 - October 10 - Hurricane Matthew unleashes catastrophic damage across the Caribbean Sea (especially in Haiti), and the Southeastern United States, causing 603 deaths and $16.47 billion in damage.

October

November

November 20–26 – Hurricane Otto killed 23 people and caused $192.2 million (2016 USD) in damage across Panama, Costa Rica and Nicaragua.  Hurricane Otto was also the first hurricane since 1996 to survive the crossover from the Atlantic Ocean to the Pacific Ocean.
November 27-30 - A tornado outbreak that unleashes 48 tornadoes caused 6 deaths and 55 injuries. It also caused at least $3.7 million in damage according to NOAA, and $275 million according to Aon.

December

December 13 - A man in Florida was struck and killed by lightning. This was the first person to die due to lightning in December since 1998.

See also
Weather by year

References

Weather by year
2016 meteorology